Birdwood High School is a public high school in the Adelaide Hill's town, Birdwood. Birdwood High School was founded in 1909 and is located beside Birdwood Primary School.

In 2013 the school opened up its exhibition centre as a venue of the Adelaide Fringe, winning the BankSA Best Venue Award.

References

High schools in South Australia